Kharkovskoye is a rural locality (a selo) and the administrative center of Kharkovskoye Rural Settlement, Rovensky District, Belgorod Oblast, Russia. The population was 584 as of 2010. There are 8 streets.

Geography 
Kharkovskoye is located 44 km north of Rovenki (the district's administrative centre) by road. Kalinichenkovo is the nearest rural locality.

References 

Rural localities in Rovensky District, Belgorod Oblast